Morpheis is a genus of moths in the family Cossidae.

Species
 Morpheis clenchi Donahue, 1980
 Morpheis cognata Walker, 1856
 Morpheis comisteon Schaus, 1911
 Morpheis discreta Dyar, 1937
 Morpheis impedita Wallengren, 1860
 Morpheis lelex Dognin, 1891
 Morpheis mathani Schaus, 1901
 Morpheis melanoleuca Burmeister, 1878
 Morpheis pyracmon Cramer, 1780
 Morpheis strigillata Felder, 1874
 Morpheis votani Schaus, 1934
 Morpheis xylotribus Herrich-Schäffer, 1853

References

External links
Natural History Museum Lepidoptera generic names catalog

Zeuzerinae